Camp Kern is a Boy Scouts of America summer camp owned and operated by the Southern Sierra Council. Camp Kern is located along the south eastern shore of Huntington Lake in the Sierra National Forest in Fresno County, California.

During the Creek Fire of 2020, Camp Kern suffered considerable wildfire damage, with most camp structures significantly damaged or destroyed.

History 
Camp Kern was established by the BSA in 1939. The camp was originally named Camp Huntington, with 39 Boy Scouts attending the first weekly session.  By the mid-1990s, the camp was hosting over 3,000 Scouts each summer.

In September, 2020, Camp Kern was fully engulfed in the Creek Fire.  Most of the camp's structures suffered serious damage or were completely destroyed.

Program 
Camp Kern, like most Scouts BSA summer camps, divides activities into different program areas such as Waterfront, Nature, Shooting Sports, and Outdoor Skills. Each area has its own staff members (age 16+) and a director (age 21+) trained at BSA's National Camp School.

During the 2019 season, Camp Kern offered 34 different merit badges and a "Trail to First Class" advancement program.  The camp also offered additional several awards and training programs for both older scouts (age 15+) and adults (age 18+), including BSA Lifeguard, Leave No Trace Awareness, and Safe Swim Defense.

References

External links
 Camp Kern Website

Kern
Kern
Buildings and structures in Fresno County, California